Geotomus is a genus of true bugs belonging to the family Cydnidae.

The species of this genus are found in Eurasia and Northern America.

Species:

Geotomus alexandria 
Geotomus angustus 
Geotomus antennatus 
Geotomus brunnipennis 
Geotomus ciliatitylus 
Geotomus convexus
Geotomus elongatus 
Geotomus jucundus 
Geotomus longicornis 
Geotomus palustris
Geotomus petiti 
Geotomus proximus 
Geotomus punctulatus 
Geotomus radialis
Geotomus regnieri 
Geotomus subtristis

References

Cydnidae